Owana may refer to:

Given name:
Theresa Owana Laanui (1860–1944), daughter of Gideon Kailipalaki Laanui of the House of Laanui
Owana Salazar, (born 1953), current co-ruler of the House of Keoua Nui
Surname:
Brice Owana (born 1989), professional Cameroonian footballer

Surnames